Dundalk was a constituency represented in the Irish House of Commons to 1801.

History
In the Patriot Parliament of 1689 summoned by James II, Dundalk was represented with two members.

Members of Parliament, 1264–1801
1560: Christopher More and Patrick Stanley
1585: Richard Bellew, Thomas Bathe and John Monye 
1613–1615: William Cashell and Richard Ellis
1634–1635: Peter Clynton and Oliver Cashell
1639–1649: Oliver Cashell (expelled and replaced 1642 by Francis Moore. Moore died and replaced 1644 by John Hatch) and Nicholas Smyth (died and replaced 1644 by John Stoyte) 
1661–1666: Wolstan Dixie and Nicholas Combes

1689–1801

Notes

References

Bibliography

Constituencies of the Parliament of Ireland (pre-1801)
Dundalk
Historic constituencies in County Louth
1264 establishments in Ireland
1800 disestablishments in Ireland
Constituencies established in 1264
Constituencies disestablished in 1800